Japan and South Korea Women's League Championship was a women's association football competition between the clubs of Nadeshiko League (Japan Women's Football League division 1) winners and WK-League (Korea Republic Women's Football League) winners.

History
The first edition was held in March 2010, where the two league winners of 2009 season competed. This competition aims at being developed into women's version of AFC Champions League, that is, many other Asian countries taking part.

Results

2010
The first edition was held at the home ground of the 2009 Japanese champion Urawa Red Diamonds Ladies. Urawa Reds reversed the one-goal behind Daekyo Kangaroos in the last five minutes and won the title.

2011
The second edition was moved to South Korea.

2012
The third edition was held at the home ground of Japanese champion INAC Kobe Leonessa.

References

Women's football competitions in Japan
Women's football competitions in South Korea
Women football